Headquartered in Tel Aviv Cortica utilizes unsupervised learning methods to recognize and analyze digital images and video. The technology developed by the Cortica team is based on research of the function of the human brain.

Company Founding

Cortica was founded in 2007 by Igal Raichelgauz, Karina Odinaev and Yehoshua Zeevi. Together, the founders developed the company’s core technology while at Technion – Israel Institute of Technology. By combining discoveries in neuroscience with developments in computer programming, the team created technology that possesses the ability to interpret large amounts of visual data with increased accuracy. This technology, called Image2Text, is based on the founders’ work in digitally replicating cortical neural networks’ ability to identify complex patterns within massive quantities of ambiguous and noisy data.

Cortica’s offerings have application in the automotive industry, media industries, as well as the smart city and medical industries. Industry experts suggest that the self-driving automotive industry alone will be worth upwards of $7 trillion while each connected car is expected to generate 4,000 GB of data per day. Beyond that, industry analysts expect the proliferation of surveillance cameras to continue leading to an expected 2,500 Petabytes of data being generated daily by new surveillance cameras. Cortica operates in these high scale industries.

The company currently employs professionals from many domains including  AI researchers as well as veterans of  intelligence units within the Israeli Defense Forces.

Research and Technology

In 2006, Founders Raichelgauz, Odinaev, and Zeevi shared their findings with the 28th IEEE EMBS Annual International Conference in New York in a paper titled, “Natural Signal Classification by Neural Cliques and Phase-Locked Attractors”.

That same year, the team also published “Cliques in Neural Ensembles as Perception Carriers"

CB Insights recently identified Cortica as the number one patent holder among AI companies.

Cortica is researching to develop a machine-learning driving system which can identify objects and pedestrians. Connecting to it, Elon Musk has been rumored to partner with Cortica for his electric car company, Tesla. However, Tesla denies it stating that Musk did not discuss a collaboration with artificial intelligence firm Cortica.

Funding

Cortica raised $7 million in its Series A funding round, announced in August 2012. Investors included Horizons Ventures (the investment firm of Hong Kong billionaire Li Ka-Shing), and Ynon Kreiz, the former chairman and CEO of the Endemol Group.

In May 2013, it was announced that Cortica had raised $1.5 million from Russian firm Mail.ru Group. It later transpired that this was a part of Cortica's Series B funding round for $6.4 million, announced in June 2013. The round was led by Horizons Ventures, with participation from the Russian firm Mail.ru Group and other angel investors.
In its fourth funding round, Cortica has raised $20 million, bringing the total investments to $38 million. According to a report from The Israeli lead Daily economic newspaper, TheMarker, the fourth round was led by a strategic Chinese investor who will probably help the company expand into the Asian market.

Media coverage

GigaOm listed Cortica as one of the top deep learning startups in a November 2013 article surveying the field, along with AlchemyAPI, Ersatz, and Semantria.

Business Insider ranked Cortica as one of the coolest tech companies in Israel.

CB Insights has identified Cortica as the top patent holding AI company.

In 2017 several leading automotive media outlets covered the launch of Cortica's automotive business unit

References

External links
 

Applied machine learning
Technology companies of Israel